Carlos Echevarría Zudaire (born 4 November 1940) is a former Spanish professional cyclist. He finished in the top 10 four times in the Vuelta a España, including third place in 1966. He also won two stages of the race, in 1965 and 1966.

Major results

1962
 1st Overall Vuelta a La Rioja
1963
 1st Overall Vuelta a La Rioja
1st Stage 1
 2nd Clásica a los Puertos de Guadarrama
 3rd Campeonato Vasco Navarro de Montaña
 7th Overall Vuelta a Andalucía
1964
 1st Overall Gran Premio de la Bicicleta Eibarresa
1st Stage 5
 2nd Overall Vuelta a La Rioja
1st Stage 3
 3rd GP Pascuas
1965
 1st GP Pascuas
 1st GP San Lorenzo
 2nd Prueba Villafranca de Ordizia
 2nd Overall Volta a Catalunya
 3rd Overall Vuelta a La Rioja
1st Stage 2
 5th Overall Vuelta a España
1st Stage 4B
1966
 1st Overall GP Leganes
 1st Campeonato Vasco Navarro de Montaña
 2nd Circuito de Getxo
 2nd Overall Critérium du Dauphiné Libéré
 1st Stage 5
 2nd National Road Race Championships
 3rd Overall Vuelta a España
1st Stage 5
1967
 1st Overall Gran Premio de la Bicicleta Eibarresa
 2nd GP Pascuas
 2nd National Road Race Championships
1968
 1st Overall GP Leganes
 3rd Trofeo Elola
 8th Overall Vuelta a España
1969
 1st Trofeo Luis Puig
 2nd GP Pascuas
 9th Overall Vuelta a España
1970
 1st Klasika Primavera
 1st Overall Vuelta a la Rioja
1st Stage 1
 1st Stage 4 Tour of the Basque Country
 3rd GP Llodio
 3rd Trofeo Luis Puig

References

1940 births
Living people
Spanish male cyclists
Spanish Vuelta a España stage winners
People from Estella Oriental
Cyclists from Navarre